Burlish Halt railway station was a station on the Severn Valley Railway in Stourport-on-Severn, Worcestershire, England. The halt opened on 31 March 1930 and closed in 1970.

References

Further reading

Disused railway stations in Worcestershire
Railway stations in Great Britain opened in 1930
Railway stations in Great Britain closed in 1970
Former Great Western Railway stations
Stourport-on-Severn